The Sixth Commandment is a 1924 American silent drama film directed by Christy Cabanne and starring William Faversham.

Plot
John Brant, a devoted minister, is in love with Marian Calhoun, but must keep it a secret because she is engaged to Robert Fields—who, unknown to Marian, is playing around with a variety of different women. Marian finds out and breaks the engagement.

Cast

Preservation
With no prints of The Sixth Commandment located in any film archives, it is a lost film.

References

External links

1924 films
American silent feature films
Lost American films
Films directed by Christy Cabanne
1924 drama films
American black-and-white films
Silent American drama films
1924 lost films
Lost drama films
Associated Exhibitors films
1920s American films